This is a list of driver records in the Australian Touring Car Championship and V8 Supercars. Drivers competing full-time in the current season are highlighted in bold text.

Starts

Event starts

Race starts

Race wins

Total

Most race wins in a season

Most race wins at the same circuit

Most wins by drivers who have not won a championship

Pole positions

Total

Championships

Total

See also
List of Australian Touring Car and V8 Supercar champions
List of Australian Touring Car Championship races

Notes

References

Australian records
Auto racing records
Supercars Championship